Erionota sybirita is a species of Indomalayan butterfly of the family Hesperiidae. It is found in Malaysia, Burma, Thailand, Borneo and Palawan.

References

Hesperiidae
Butterflies described in 1876
Butterflies of Asia
Taxa named by William Chapman Hewitson